Richard Krajicek was the defending champion, but lost to Roberto Carretero in the second round.

Thomas Muster won the title, defeating Magnus Larsson 6–2, 6–1, 6–4 in the final.

Seeds
The top eight seeds receive a bye into the second round.

Draw

Finals

Top half

Section 1

Section 2

Bottom half

Section 3

Section 4

References

External links
Main Draw

1995 ATP Tour